A volcanic plateau is a plateau produced by volcanic activity. There are two main types: lava plateaus and pyroclastic plateaus.

Lava plateau 

Lava plateaus are formed by highly fluid basaltic lava during numerous successive eruptions through numerous vents without violent explosions (quiet eruptions). These eruptions are quiet because of low viscosity of  lava, so that it is very fluid and contains a small amount of trapped gases. The resulting sheet lava flows may be extruded from linear fissures or rifts or gigantic volcanic eruptions through multiple vents characteristic of the prehistoric era which produced giant flood basalts. Multiple successive and extensive lava flows cover the original landscape to eventually form a plateau, which may contain lava fields, cinder cones, shield volcanoes and other volcanic landforms. In some cases, a lava plateau may be part of a single volcano.

This region, known as the Thulean Plateau, is generally believed to have been broken up by foundering of the Earth's crust to form the present ocean basin.

Earth features numerous subaerial and submarine volcanic plateaus such as the Columbia River Plateau (subaerial) and the vast Ontong Java Plateau (submarine).

Pyroclastic plateau 
Pyroclastic plateaus are produced by massive pyroclastic flows. They are underlain by pyroclastic rocks: agglomerates, tephra, volcanic ashes cemented into tuffs, mafic or felsic. Pyroclastic plateaus are also called ignimbrite plateaus.

Examples include Shirasu-Daichi which covers almost all of southern Kyūshū, Japan and the North Island Volcanic Plateau in New Zealand.

See also

References 

 
Volcanic landforms